Feast is the debut studio album by British duo the Creatures, composed of Siouxsie Sioux and musician Budgie, then-members of the band Siouxsie and the Banshees. It reached No. 17 in the UK Albums Chart and the "Miss the Girl" single peaked at No. 21. With their first album, the band embraced exotica, including "waves crashing on beaches", "found-sound effects from nature" and local Hawaiian chanters. Critic Ned Raggett described it as "a lush, tropical experience".

Recording and music
Siouxsie and Budgie decided where to record the album by randomly placing a pin on a map of the world; the result was the U.S. state of Hawaii. Several songs are about their experiences in that region, including "Festival of Colours" and "A Strutting Rooster".

Mark Brennan of Melody Maker said that the album's opening track "Morning Dawning" "begins with the sound of complicity: waves rushing against a beach, waves that are [...] the languid laps of dawn – a soundtrack for the netherland that are souvenirs between memories of dark and anticipations of light, the state between lingering in the past and launching into the future".

The song title "Inoa ʻOle" is Hawaiian for "no name". "Ice House" was inspired by an obscure television play, while single "Miss the Girl" was inspired by the J. G. Ballard novel Crash. "Dancing on Glass" was based on an Indian musical; during the studio session, the sounds of broken glass were created by Siouxsie and Budgie dancing on broken mirrors while wearing tough shoes.

Release
Feast was released by Polydor Records on 15 May 1983, two years after the Wild Things EP. Feast was also the first album released on Wonderland, a label created in 1983 by the members of Siouxsie and the Banshees.

The album was entirely remastered in 1997 and reissued as part of the A Bestiary Of CD compilation.

Critical reception

Feast was released to critical acclaim. Paul Prayag of Record Mirror praised the album, awarding it a score of 4 out of 5 and writing: "Siouxsie and Budgie are wandering deeper and deeper into a jungle that looks like having no easily definable boundaries". Melody Maker described Feast as "an album of filtered brilliance, fertile, sensual and erotic; an album that, in its desperate naivety, attempts to articulate that moment when the monsoon ends, when the smell and the heat conspire in a perfumed mist and life sprouts instantly, green and luxurious". Reviewer Mark Brennan said it was "breathlessly exotic and breathtakingly erotic". NME also hailed it: "The Creatures have assembled a multifarious sonic boom that is as various and kaleidoscopic as can be imagined. The humours of Sioux's frosty larynx are nakedly outlined against skins of sometimes fabulous quality. The drum sound on 'Ice House' must be one of the greatest on record".

Track listing

Personnel
The Creatures
Siouxsie Sioux – vocals
Budgie – drums, percussion
with:
The Lamalani Hula Academy Hawaiian Chanters – choir on "Morning Dawning", "Inoa 'Ole" and "A Strutting Rooster"
Technical
The Creatures - recording
Rob O'Connor, The Creatures - sleeve design
Gil Gilbert - photography
"Sea noises courtesy of Sunset Beach. Jungle noises courtesy of Rick and Donna's back garden. Broken glass courtesy of the night before."

References

1983 debut albums
The Creatures albums
Albums produced by Mike Hedges